Fusion Lifestyle Clements Hall Leisure Centre, is a sports centre managed by Fusion Lifestyle, for Rochford District Council. 

The centre has a wetside area, with a 25 m swimming pool, teaching pool, sauna, steam room and jacuzzi; and a dryside area consisting of a large, fully equipped gym, studios, climbing wall, badminton, squash, volleyball and basketball courts, creche, cafe and an AstroTurf pitch.

It is also the home to Rochford and District Swimming Club.

Fusion Lifestyle also manage other sites in the area: Rayleigh Leisure Centre;as well as two events centres: The Mill and The Freight House.

Major events
In November 2007, lifeguards pulled a man from the pool after he went into cardiac arrest. The man is believed to have fully recovered, thanks to lifeguards, emergency service and hospital staff.

On 22 November 2010, lifeguards resuscitated a man who suffered a heart problem whilst playing football on the astro turf.

References

External links
 Clements Hall Leisure Centre
 Rochford District Council
 Rochford and District Swimming Club

Rochford District